The Union of Needletrades, Industrial, and Textile Employees (UNITE, often stylized UNITE!) was a labor union in the United States. In 2004, UNITE merged with the Hotel Employees and Restaurant Employees Union (HERE) to form UNITE HERE.

History
UNITE was formed in 1995 as a merger between the International Ladies' Garment Workers' Union (ILGWU) and the Amalgamated Clothing and Textile Workers Union (ACTWU).

Merger
In 2004, UNITE announced that it would merge with the Hotel Employees and Restaurant Employees Union (HERE) to form UNITE HERE. In 2009 most of the apparel and laundry workers in UNITE HERE broke away to form a separate union known as Workers United, which affiliated with the Service Employees International Union.

UNITE's core industries were textile and apparel manufacturing, distribution, and retailing, but they also had locals involved in industrial laundry, and manufacturing in other industries.

Jay Mazur served as president of UNITE from its inception until his retirement in 2001. Bruce Raynor was then elected president, where he served until the HERE merger.

External links
 

UNITE HERE
Textile and clothing trade unions
Women's occupational organizations
Defunct trade unions in the United States
Trade unions established in 1995
Trade unions disestablished in 2004